Khamza Aliyovych Harsiyev (born 22 December 2001) is a Ukrainian professional footballer who plays as a centre-forward for Ukrainian club Volyn Lutsk.

References

External links
 Profile on Volyn Lutsk official website
 

2001 births
Living people
Place of birth missing (living people)
Ukrainian footballers
Association football forwards
FC Volyn Lutsk players
Ukrainian First League players
Ukrainian Second League players